Route 230 is the main Bonavista Peninsula Highway, commencing from Route 1 (the Trans Canada Highway) at Thorburn Lake, about 10-15 kilometres north of Clarenville and proceeding all the way to Bonavista at the end of the Peninsula. The highway also carries the designation of Discovery Trail.

Route description

Route 230 begins a few kilometres northwest of Clarenville at an interchange with Route 1 (Trans-Canada Highway, Exit 26), just southeast of Thorburn Lake. It heads east to bypass Clarenville along its north side, where it meets Route 230A (Old Bonavista Highway) at the Clarenville Airport. The highway now heads northeast through rural areas to pass Morley's Siding and Lethbridge, where it has intersections with Route 233 (Clode Sound Road) and Route 234 (Winter Brook Road). Route 230 heads through rural areas for several more kilometres to pass through Southern Bay, where it meets a local road leading to Charleston and Sweet Bay as well as meeting the southern end of Route 235 (Bonavista Bay Highway). The highway heads through more rural terrain before entering the Trinity Bight area and beginning to follow the southern coastline of the peninsula at Lockston, where it also has an intersection with Route 239 (New Bonaventure Road). Route 230 has an intersection with Route 236 (Stock Cove Road) before passing through Port Rexton, where it meets a local road leading to Trinity East. The highway now passes through Champney's Arm, where it meets two local roads, one leading to Champney's West, and the other leading to Champney's East and English Harbour, before heading northeast through inland, rural, and hilly for the next several kilometres. Route 230 now heads north along the coast to pass through the town of Trinity Bay North, where it passes the communities of Melrose, Port Union, and Catalina, as well as where it meets Route 237 (Blackhead Bay Road). The highway now leaves Trinity Bay North and it meets a local road leading to Little Catalina before heading north through rural areas, where it has an intersection with Route 238 (Elliston Road). Route 230 now enters the Bonavista town limits along Confederation Drive, and heads north through neighbourhoods and business district to have another intersection with Route 238  (Coster Street) as Route 230 bypasses downtown along its west side. The highway passes through more neighbourhoods before making a sharp left turn and coming to an end shortly thereafter at another intersection with Route 235 (Church Street).

As with most highways in Newfoundland and Labrador, the entire length of Route 230 is a two-lane highway.

Major intersections

References

230